Nyx viscachensis is a moth of the family Choreutidae. It is known from Chile at elevations between 1,400 and 1,700 meters.

The larvae feed on Puya coerulea.

References

Millieriidae
Endemic fauna of Chile
Moths described in 1998